Joiada ( Yōyāḏā‘, "Yah knows") is a name found from the form "Jehoiada" in the Hebrew Bible and used alternately in English versions.  Joiada is the fourth High Priest of Israel after the Babylonian captivity and his name is only found in the lists of Neh 12:10-11, 22 and in Neh 13:28. Most historians describe Joiada as the son of Eliashib, ca. 433-410 BCE. However, there are two existing problems with the chronologies. First, it is believed that Joiada may be the grandson of Eliashib. The word "son" may refer to a father-son relationship, but alternatively refers  to a grandson or brother. However, it is suggested that (Ezra 2:43 & Neh 12:23) are related and may be referring to another Eliashib and Johanan because they were common names at that time. The second problem involves the time span of the list given because some believe the list Eliashib to Joiada to Jonathan to Jaddua was a time span of 150 years. It is also possible that not all of the names of the high priests are included.

The only information given about Joiada is that his son married the daughter of Sanballat the Horonite for which he was driven out of the Temple by Nehemiah. This is important because the books of Ezra and Book of Nehemiah contain severe instructions against marrying foreign women. These foreign marriages led to tension between the Jewish governor and the high-priestly family. The son of Joiada was removed from the temple by Nehemiah and banished from Judah, however nothing suggests that Joiada's family received further punishment.

Patrilineal Ancestry

References

Sources 
Williamson, H.G.M. 1977. The Historical Value of Josephus' Jewish Antiquities XI. 297-301. JTS 28:49-66. 
Vanderkam, James. From Joshua to Caiaphas. 53-54.
 Gottheil/Krauss, 2002. Jewishencyclopedia.com

5th-century BCE High Priests of Israel
Book of Nehemiah